Major-General Roger Ellis Tudor St John, CB, MC (4 October 1911 – 15 October 1998) was a British Army officer.

Military career
Educated at Wellington College, Berkshire and the Royal Military College, Sandhurst, St. John was commissioned into the Royal Northumberland Fusiliers on 27 August 1931. He served in the Second World War as brigade major for the 11th Armoured Division and, after the war, went on to become commanding officer of the 1st Battalion Royal Northumberland Fusiliers in 1953 and commander of 11th Infantry Brigade Group in 1957.

He became colonel of the Royal Northumberland Fusiliers in October 1965.

References

 

British Army generals
1911 births
1998 deaths
Royal Northumberland Fusiliers officers
Companions of the Order of the Bath
Recipients of the Military Cross
British Army personnel of World War II
Graduates of the Royal Military College, Sandhurst
People educated at Wellington College, Berkshire